Duncanville Air Force Station (ADC ID: P-78) is a closed United States Air Force General Surveillance Radar station.  It is located on the east side of Duncanville, Texas.  It was closed in 1964.

History
Duncanville  Air Force Station was one of twenty-eight stations built as part of the second segment of the permanent Air Defense Command network. Prompted by the start of the Korean War, on July 11, 1950, the Secretary of the Air Force asked the Secretary of Defense for approval to expedite construction of the second segment of the permanent network. Receiving the Defense Secretary's approval on July 21, the Air Force directed the Corps of Engineers to proceed with construction.

Located on the site of the former Naval Air Station, Duncanville, with a mission to provide radar coverage of the Dallas-Fort Worth area, the 745th Aircraft Control and Warning Squadron began operating an AN/CPS-6B and an AN/FPS-10 radar at this site on 1 February 1953, and initially the station functioned as a Ground-Control Intercept (GCI) and warning station.  As a GCI station, the squadron's role was to guide interceptor aircraft toward unidentified intruders picked up on the unit's radar scopes.  In 1958 the height-finder radar was replaced by an AN/FPS-6.

On July 17, 1957, the AFS, along with two other stations in other states helped track an unexplained object following an RB-47 Air Force Radar Reconnaissance Jet for more than 90 minutes. Two planes from the Air Base were dispatched as well. The object was never identified, and no explanation was ever concluded.

In 1959, the  United States Army opened Army Air-Defense Command Post DF-30DC for Nike Missile air-defense system, Dallas-Fort Worth Defense Area in 1959.  Duncanville was incorporated into BUIC I, a manual back-up interceptor control system implemented in 1962. BUIC I provided limited command and control capability in the event the SAGE system was disabled.

Duncanville AFS closed on July 1, 1964, when the 745th Radar Squadron transferred to Perrin AFS, TX (RP-78).  Army Nike operations ended in 1969.   After its closure, the Navy took over the housing units for Naval Air Station Dallas. Three acres were deeded to the City of Duncanville in late 1998 for development of a new swimming pool, landscaped walkway, jogging trail, a park entrance and expanded parking.

Air Force units and assignments 
Units:
 745th Aircraft Control and Warning Squadron, Activated 1 February 1953 at Duncanville AFS, TX
 Transferred to Perrin Air Force Station, TX, 1 July 1964

Assignments:
 33d Air Division, 1 February 1953
 Oklahoma City Air Defense Sector, 1 January 1960
 4752d Air Defense Wing, 1 September 1961
 Oklahoma City Air Defense Sector, 25 June 1963 – 1 July 1964

See also
 United States general surveillance radar stations

References

  A Handbook of Aerospace Defense Organization 1946–1980,  by Lloyd H. Cornett and Mildred W. Johnson, Office of History, Aerospace Defense Center, Peterson Air Force Base, Colorado
 Winkler, David F. (1997), Searching the skies: the legacy of the United States Cold War defense radar program. Prepared for United States Air Force Headquarters Air Combat Command.
 Information for Duncanville AFS, TX

Permanent System radar stations
Semi-Automatic Ground Environment sites
Installations of the United States Air Force in Texas
Military installations established in 1957
Military installations closed in 1969
1957 establishments in Texas
1969 disestablishments in Texas
U.S. Army Nike sites